In aeronautics and aviation, loiter is the phase of flight  consisting of flying over some small region.  

In general aviation, the loiter phase generally occurs at the end of the flight, when the plane is waiting for clearance to land.

In military flights, such as aerial reconnaissance or ground-attack aircraft, the loiter phase is the time that the aircraft has over a target. Cruise is the time period the aircraft travels to the target and returns after the loiter.

In astronautics, the loiter phase of spacecraft used for human spaceflight may be as long as six months, as is the case for Soyuz spacecraft which remain docked while expedition crewmembers reside aboard the International Space Station.

Endurance

The endurance of the aircraft during the loiter phase is often calculated using the Breguet formula:

where:
  is the endurance (dimensions of Time)
  is the Specific Fuel Consumption (dimensions of 1/Time)
  is the total lift force on the aircraft
  is the total drag force on the aircraft
  is the weight of the aircraft at the start of the phase
  is the weight of the aircraft at the end of the phase

See also
 Endurance (aeronautics)
 Bovingdon stack, a holding pattern in the United Kingdom
 Flight planning
 Holding

References

Flight phases